Cornel Ciurea (born November 12, 1972) is an "expert" in politics and governing institutions and a former politician from the Republic of Moldova.

He graduated from the National School of Administration and Political Science of Bucharest and the Academy of Economic Studies of Moldova. Ciurea worked for TeleRadio-Moldova (1994–1996). He served as the director of the weekly Democrația (2006–2009). Ciurea has served as a political expert of the Institute for Development and Social Initiatives (IDIS) “Viitorul” since 2009. Between 2010 and 2011, Ciurea was an Organization for Security and Co-operation in Europe expert on political party legislation and a coordinator of a project on the National Convention for European Integration.

Cornel Ciurea served as a Vice President of the Social Liberal Party (May 9, 2001 – February 10, 2008). He ran for Mayor of Chișinău in the Moldovan local elections of 2007.

References

External links 
 Date biografice ale candidatului la funcția de primar general al municipiului Chișinău Corneliu Ciurea

1972 births
Living people
Politicians from Chișinău
National University of Political Studies and Public Administration alumni
Moldovan jurists